French 75 is a cocktail made from gin, champagne, lemon juice, and sugar. It is also called a 75 Cocktail, or in French simply a Soixante Quinze (Seventy Five).

The drink dates to World War I, and an early form was created in 1915 at the New York Bar in Paris—later Harry's New York Bar—by barman Harry MacElhone. The combination was said to have such a kick that it felt like being shelled with the powerful French 75mm field gun.

History
The drink with its current name and recipe developed over the 1920s, though similar drinks date to the 19th century. In the 19th century, the champagne cup was a popular cocktail, consisting of champagne, lemon juice, sugar, and ice. Gin was sometimes added, yielding a drink much like the French 75.

The drink was first recorded as the "75" in Harry's ABC of Mixing Cocktails, 1922 edition, by Harry MacElhone, and in the same year in Robert Vermeire's Cocktails: How to Mix Them, which credits the drink to MacElhone. However, the recipes differed from the current form – MacElhone's version consisted of Calvados, gin, grenadine, and absinthe, while Vermeire added lemon juice.

The recipe took its now-classic form and "French 75" name in Here’s How, by Judge Jr. (1927), consisting of gin, sugar, lemon juice, and champagne. This recipe was republished with the name "French 75" in The Savoy Cocktail Book (1930), which helped popularize the drink. Some later cocktail books use cognac instead of gin, such as The Fine Art of Mixing Drinks by David A. Embury.

The French 75 was popularized in America at the Stork Club in New York. It appears in the movie Casablanca (1942) and is referenced twice in the John Wayne films A Man Betrayed (1941) and Jet Pilot (1957). In 2016, it appears in the ITV series Mr. Selfridge, which is set in London in the 1910s and 1920s.

A fanciful alternative story of the invention of the French 75 was related by humorist Jean Shepherd on November 17, 1969, wherein he credits Gervais Raoul Lufbery as the inventor. The mixture, as related by Shepherd, is champagne and cognac on ice with perhaps a twist of lemon. This version is not credible, given the documented earlier version.

Similar drinks
The recipe of the French 75 is very similar to one of the most popular cocktails, the Tom Collins, with champagne replacing carbonated water. According to the recipe in Harry MacElhone's book Harry's ABC of Mixing Cocktails, a French 75 is supposed to be served in a highball glass. The highball glass, which the Tom Collins cocktail is also served in, supports the theory of the French 75 being a variation of the Tom Collins.

A "French 125" replaces the gin for cognac.

References

External links
 
 
 
 

Cocktails with Champagne
Cocktails with gin